Larn is a roguelike computer game written by Noah Morgan in 1986 for the UNIX operating system. Morgan's original version of Larn remains part of the NetBSD games collection.

Larn is one of the shorter roguelike games. It can take many hours and tens (or even hundreds) of thousands of game turns to beat other roguelikes, such as NetHack or Ancient Domains of Mystery, but Larn can reasonably be completed in one play session.

History
Primary development of Larn halted in 1991 with version 12.3, but its open source nature has led to later variants. Developers have ported the game to such diverse operating systems as Solaris, Amiga OS, Atari TOS, and Microsoft Windows.

On October 4th 2015, a GitHub repository was created and Larn started to be developed and maintained once again from the original source code. This makes Larn one of the oldest video games still being developed.

ULarn
In 1987, Phil Cordier modified the Larn source code to form Ultra-Larn, or more commonly, ULarn. It introduced true character classes and additional levels, weapons, etc. As with its parent, other developers have maintained and refined ULarn in the absence of its author.

Gameplay
Larn is one of the first roguelike games to feature a persistent home level—in this case, a town. In addition to the player's residence, the town offers a bank, a shop, a trading post, a school, a tax administration office, and entrances to two dungeons, one of which is a volcano.

The goal of Larn is for the player to traverse a dungeon in search of a potion that will cure his ailing daughter of 'dianthroritis'. This quest is time-limited, measured in 'mobuls'. Apart from the main dungeon's ten levels, three additional levels are located beneath a volcanic shaft. To obtain the sought-after potion, the player must first acquire adequate experience, power, and gold. Larn increases in difficulty each time it is finished, making it harder for players to perform in-game actions, such as destroying walls or statues. Larn also requires the player pay a tax in subsequent games based on the amount of money in the player's possession when the game was last won.

References

External links
 The unofficial Larn game homepage with links to articles, source code, other variants of Larn, and an option to play the DOS and Amiga versions of Larn online
 
 
 Josh Brandt's ULarn
 Larn Blog with Strategies/Easter Eggs
 NLarn, an adaptation of Larn for Linux, Mac OS X, Windows
 dLarn A free (no ads, no in-game purchases) re-implementation of uLarn for Android with graphics
 XLarn a heavily extended version of Larn

Roguelike video games
1986 video games
Video games with available source code
Video games developed in the United States